Vellore G. Ramabhadran (4 August 1929 – 27 February 2012) was a Mridangam artiste from Tamil Nadu, India. He was awarded the Madras Music Academy's Sangeetha Kalanidhi in 2004.

Early years
Born in Vellore, he showed interest in Carnatic music even at an early age. His father Konnakol T. P. Gopalachari, a musician himself, was running a Music Sabha in Vellore. This sabha conducted competitions in Carnatic music among children. Maestros like Kancheepuram Naina Pillai, Palghat Mani Iyer and Pudukottai Dakshinamurthy Pillai judged competitors and awarded prizes. M. S. Subbulakshmi has given a concert in this Sabha in 1936
Young Ramabhadran was fascinated by the music concerts and started learning Mridangam from his father at the age of eight.
During World War II people living in Madras (presently, Chennai) evacuated the city and moved to interior towns and villages. In 1942, Thiruparkadal Srinivasa Iyengar moved from Chennai to Salem. It gave an opportunity for Ramabhadran to learn vocal music from him. 
Ramabhadran moved to Chennai in 1950
and took residence at Mylapore.

Performances
In his first stage appearance, he accompanied Madurai Mani Iyer on the Mridangam. During the 1940s there were not many Sabhas in Chennai. He accompanied Madurai Mani Iyer in concerts held at various temples throughout Tamil Nadu.
Ramabhadran has performed as an accompanying Mridangam artiste to Carnatic music doyens Ariyakudi Ramanuja Iyengar, Chembai Vaidyanatha Bhagavatar, Maharajapuram Viswanatha Iyer, Semmangudi Srinivasa Iyer, Musiri Subramania Iyer, G. N. Balasubramaniam, K.V.Narayanaswamy, M.Balamuralikrishna, Maharajapuram Santhanam, T. V. Sankaranarayanan, T. N. Seshagopalan, B. Rajam Iyer, P. S. Narayanaswamy and to Illustrious Instrumentalists like T. R. Mahalingam, N. Ramani, Lalgudi Jayaraman and T. N. Krishnan.
He has also performed with North Indian Music artistes Zakir Hussein, Alla Rakha, Amjad Ali Khan and Hariprasad Chaurasia.

Concerts abroad
Ramabhadran went to United States for the first time in 1962 with Veena maestro S. Balachander, N. Ramani, and Umayalapuram K Sivaraman. They performed in many cities and universities from coast to coast.He performed in the Festivals of India held in the U.K., USA and U.S.S.R.

Unforgettable experience
Ramabhadran recalls performing a concert for the prisoners in the Palayamkottai Central Prison in 1948 is an unforgettable experience. He accompanied M. M. Dandapani Desikar in that concert.
Likewise a remarkable experience for him was the receiving of Sangeetha Choodamani award from the top Mridandam Vidwan Palghat Mani Iyer in 1975. The award was accorded by the Krishna Gana Sabha, Chennai.

His thoughts
Ramabhadran opines that Mridangam is an accompanying instrument and it should not interrupt the main artiste. The Mridangam artiste can show his skill during the few minutes he/she is given for "Thani Avarthanam" (Solo interludes).

Performance in Tamil film
Ramabhadran accompanied K. J. Yesudas on the mridangan for the song "Mari, mari, ninne" in the Tamil film Sindhu Bhairavi produced by K. Balachandar. The film scene shows actor Sivakumar as the singer and Delhi Ganesh as the mridangam artiste.

Awards and honours
 Sangeetha Choodamani, 1975 by Krishna Gana Sabha, Chennai
 Sangeetha Kalanidhi, 2004 by Music Academy, Chennai
 Sangeet Natak Akademi Award, 1991 by Sangeet Natak Akademi
 Sangeetha Kalasikhamani, 1998 by The Indian Fine Arts Society, Chennai
 Sangeet Natak Akademi Tagore Ratna, 2012 by Sangeet Natak Akademi

Death
Vellore G. Ramabhadran died on 27 February 2012, aged 82.

Disciples 
Vellore Ramabhadran has trained many mridangam players. His three most senior disciples are Prakash Rao, currently residing in New Jersey, USA, and Ramesh Srinivasan, currently residing in California, USA, and Anantha Kulathupuzha, currently residing in Trivandhapuram KERALA.

References

External links
 
 

1929 births
2012 deaths
Mridangam players
Sangeetha Kalanidhi recipients
20th-century Indian musicians
20th-century drummers
Recipients of the Sangeet Natak Akademi Award